The 2010 Clásica de Almería was the 25th edition of the Clásica de Almería cycle race and was held on 28 February 2010. The race started and finished in Almería. The race was won by Theo Bos.

General classification

References

2010
2010 in road cycling
2010 in Spanish sport